The 2002 Fed Cup was the 40th edition of the most important competition between national teams in women's tennis.

The final took place at the Palacio de Congresos de Maspalomas in Gran Canaria, Spain on 2–3 November. Slovakia defeated Spain, giving Slovakia their first title.

World Group

Draw

World Group play-offs

The eight losing teams in the World Group first round ties and eight winners of the Zonal Group I sections competed in the World Group play-offs for spots in the 2003 World Group.

Date: 20–21 July

Americas Zone

 Nations in bold advanced to the higher level of competition.
 Nations in italics were relegated down to a lower level of competition.

Group I
Venue: San Luis Potosí, Mexico (outdoor hard)

Dates: 23–27 April

Participating Teams

Group II
Venue: Havana, Cuba (outdoor hard)

Dates: 14–18 May

Participating Teams

 
 
 
 
 
 
  Eastern Caribbean

Asia/Oceania Zone

 Nations in bold advanced to the higher level of competition.
 Nations in italics were relegated down to a lower level of competition.

Group I
Venue: Guangzhou, China (outdoor hard)

Dates: 4–9 March

Participating Teams

Group II
Venue: Guangzhou, China (outdoor hard)

Dates: 4–8 March

Participating Teams

 
 
  Pacific Oceania

Europe/Africa Zone

 Nations in bold advanced to the higher level of competition.
 Nations in italics were relegated down to a lower level of competition.

Group I
Venue: Antalya, Turkey (outdoor clay)

Dates: 24–28 April

Participating Teams

Group II
Venue: Pretoria, South Africa (outdoor hard)

Dates: 9–13 April

Participating Teams

Year-End Rankings
The Fed Cup rankings were first instated on 4 November 2002, and were measured by combining points earned from the previous four years. The first No. 1 ranked nation, and the year-end No. 1 for 2002, was Slovakia.

References

External links 
 Fed Cup

 
Billie Jean King Cups by year
Fed
2002 in women's tennis